This is a list of Togolese regions by Human Development Index as of 2021, and the city of Lomé.

References 

Tgo
Human Development Index
Regions of Togo